Eleanor Shanley, from Keshcarrigan in County Leitrim in the North West of Ireland, is an Irish and Roots musician. She made her first appearance as a singer with traditional group De Danann, and subsequently with Ronnie Drew. She has also toured with Christy Moore and Sharon Shannon and as a soloist both in Ireland and abroad.

Shanley has recorded with Ronnie Drew, Sharon Shannon, Eddi Reader, Tommy Fleming, Desmond O'Halloran, Dolores Keane, Christy Hennessy, The Dubliners, and many others. Her current collaborators are Frankie Lane and Paul Kelly, with whom she has performed since 2002.

Collaborations
 Tommy Fleming's Restless Spirit album.
 De Danann's How the West was Won.
 Dubliners' 30 Years a Greying
 Frankie Lane's Gunsmoke at El Paso.
 With Frankie Lane and Paul Kelly: A Place of My Own
 Ronnie Drew on albums "“A Couple More Years" and "El Amor De Mi Vida"

References

External links
 Official site

Irish women singers
Year of birth missing (living people)
Living people
People from County Leitrim
Musicians from County Leitrim
De Dannan members